|-
!oaa 
| || ||I/L|| || ||Orok|| || ||鄂罗克语|| ||
|-
!oac 
| || ||I/L|| || ||Oroch|| || ||鄂罗奇语|| ||
|-
!oar 
| || ||I/A|| || ||Aramaic, Old|| || ||古阿拉米语|| ||Altaramäisch
|-
!oav 
| || ||I/H|| || ||Avar, Old|| || ||古阿瓦尔语|| ||
|-
!obi 
| || ||I/E|| || ||Obispeño|| || || || ||
|-
!obk 
| || ||I/L|| || ||Southern Bontok|| || || || ||
|-
!obl 
| || ||I/L|| || ||Oblo|| || || || ||
|-
!obm 
| || ||I/A|| || ||Moabite|| || ||摩押语|| ||
|-
!obo 
| || ||I/L|| || ||Manobo, Obo|| || || || ||
|-
!obr 
| || ||I/H|| || ||Burmese, Old|| || ||古缅甸语|| ||Altburmesisch
|-
!obt 
| || ||I/H|| || ||Breton, Old|| || ||古布列塔尼语|| ||Altbretonisch
|-
!obu 
| || ||I/L|| || ||Obulom|| || || || ||
|-
!oca 
| || ||I/L|| || ||Ocaina|| ||ocaina|| || ||
|-
!(occ) 
| || || || || ||Occidental|| || || || ||
|-
!och 
| || ||I/A||Chinese|| ||Old Chinese|| || ||上古漢語|| ||Altchinesisch
|-
!oci 
|oc||oci||I/L||Indo-European||occitan||Occitan (post 1500)||occitan (après 1500)||occitano||奥克西唐语; 奥克西坦语; 奥克语||окситанский||Okzitanisch
|-
!oco 
| || ||I/H|| || ||Cornish, Old|| || ||古康沃尔语|| ||
|-
!ocu 
| || ||I/L|| || ||Matlatzinca, Atzingo|| || || || ||
|-
!oda 
| || ||I/L|| || ||Odut|| || || || ||
|-
!odk 
| || ||I/L|| || ||Od|| || || || ||
|-
!odt 
| || ||I/H|| || ||Dutch, Old|| || ||古荷兰语|| ||
|-
!odu 
| || ||I/L|| || ||Odual|| || || || ||
|-
!ofo 
| || ||I/E|| || ||Ofo||ofo|| || || ||
|-
!ofs 
| || ||I/H||Friesisch|| ||Frisian, Old|| || ||古弗里西亚语|| ||Altfriesisch
|-
!ofu 
| || ||I/L|| || ||Efutop|| || || || ||
|-
!ogb 
| || ||I/L|| || ||Ogbia|| || || || ||
|-
!ogc 
| || ||I/L|| || ||Ogbah|| || || || ||
|-
!oge 
| || ||I/H|| || ||Georgian, Old|| || ||古格鲁吉亚语|| ||Altgeorgisch
|-
!ogg 
| || ||I/L|| || ||Ogbogolo|| || || || ||
|-
!(ogn) 
| || || || || ||Ogan|| || || || ||
|-
!ogo 
| || ||I/L|| || ||Khana|| || || || ||
|-
!ogu 
| || ||I/L|| || ||Ogbronuagum|| || || || ||
|-
!oht 
| || ||I/A|| || ||Hittite, Old|| || ||古赫梯语|| ||
|-
!ohu 
| || ||I/H|| || ||Hungarian, Old|| || ||古匈牙利语|| ||
|-
!oia 
| || ||I/L|| || ||Oirata|| || || ||оирата||
|-
!oin 
| || ||I/L|| || ||One, Inebu|| || || || ||
|-
!ojb 
| || ||I/L|| || Anishinaabemowin (Ojibwemowin) ||Ojibwa, Northwestern|| || || || ||
|-
!ojc 
| || ||I/L|| || Anishinaabemowin (Ojibwemowin) ||Ojibwa, Central|| || || || ||
|-
!ojg 
| || ||I/L|| || Nishnaabemwin (Jibwemwin) ||Ojibwa, Eastern|| || || || ||
|-
!oji 
|oj||oji||M/L||Cree||ᐊᓂᔑᓇᐯᒧᐎᓐ (Anishinaabemowin)||Ojibwa||ojibwa||ojibwa||奥吉布瓦语||оджибва||
|-
!ojp 
| || ||I/H|| || ||Japanese, Old|| || ||古日语|| ||
|-
!ojs 
| || ||I/L|| || ᐊᓂᔑᓂᓂᒧᐎᓐ (Anishininiimowin) ||Ojibwa, Severn|| || || || ||
|-
!ojv 
| || ||I/L|| || ||Ontong Java|| || || || ||Ontong Java
|-
!ojw 
| || ||I/L|| || Anihšināpēmowin (Nakawēmowin) ||Ojibwa, Western|| || || || ||
|-
!oka 
| || ||I/L|| || ||Okanagan|| || || || ||
|-
!okb 
| || ||I/L|| || ||Okobo|| || || || ||
|-
!okd 
| || ||I/L|| || ||Okodia|| || || || ||
|-
!oke 
| || ||I/L|| || ||Okpe (Southwestern Edo)|| || || || ||
|-
!okg 
| || ||I/E|| || ||Koko Babangk|| || || || ||
|-
!okh 
| || ||I/L|| || ||Koresh-e Rostam|| || || || ||
|-
!oki 
| || ||I/L|| || ||Okiek|| || || || ||
|-
!okj 
| || ||I/E|| || ||Oko-Juwoi|| || || || ||
|-
!okk 
| || ||I/L|| || ||One, Kwamtim|| || || || ||
|-
!okl 
| || ||I/E|| || ||Old Kentish Sign Language|| || ||古肯特手语|| ||
|-
!okm 
| || ||I/H|| || ||Korean, Middle (10th–16th centuries)|| || ||中古朝鲜语|| ||Mittelkoreanisch
|-
!okn 
| || ||I/L|| || ||Oki-No-Erabu|| || ||冲永良部岛琉球语|| ||
|-
!oko 
| || ||I/H|| || ||Korean, Old (3rd–9th centuries)|| || ||古朝鲜语|| ||Altkoreanisch
|-
!okr 
| || ||I/L|| || ||Kirike|| || || || ||
|-
!oks 
| || ||I/L|| || ||Oko-Eni-Osayen|| || || || ||
|-
!oku 
| || ||I/L|| || ||Oku|| || || || ||
|-
!okv 
| || ||I/L|| || ||Orokaiva|| || || || ||
|-
!okx 
| || ||I/L|| || ||Okpe (Northwestern Edo)|| || || || ||
|-
!ola 
| || ||I/L|| || ||Walungge|| || || || ||
|-
!old 
| || ||I/L|| || ||Mochi|| || || || ||
|-
!ole 
| || ||I/L|| || ||Olekha|| || || || ||
|-
!olk 
| || ||I/E|| || ||Olkol|| || || || ||
|-
!olm 
| || ||I/L|| || ||Oloma|| || || || ||
|-
!olo 
| || ||I/L|| || ||Livvi|| || || || ||
|-
!olr 
| || ||I/L|| || ||Olrat|| || || || ||
|-
!olt 
| || ||I/H||Indo-European|| ||Old Lithuanian|| || || || ||
|-
!olu 
| || ||I/L||Niger–Congo|| ||Kuvale|| || || || ||
|-
!oma 
| || ||I/L|| || ||Omaha-Ponca||omaha-ponca||omaha-ponca|| || ||
|-
!omb 
| || ||I/L|| || ||Ambae, East|| || || || ||
|-
!omc 
| || ||I/E|| || ||Mochica|| || || || ||
|-
!(ome) 
| || ||I/E|| || ||Omejes|| || || || ||
|-
!omg 
| || ||I/L|| || ||Omagua|| ||omagua|| || ||
|-
!omi 
| || ||I/L|| || ||Omi|| || || || ||
|-
!omk 
| || ||I/E|| || ||Omok|| || || || ||
|-
!oml 
| || ||I/L|| || ||Ombo|| || || || ||
|-
!omn 
| || ||I/A|| || ||Minoan|| || || || ||
|-
!omo 
| || ||I/L|| || ||Utarmbung|| || || || ||
|-
!omp 
| || ||I/H|| || ||Manipuri, Old|| || ||古曼尼普尔语|| ||
|-
!omr 
| || ||I/H|| || ||Marathi, Old|| || ||古马拉地语|| ||
|-
!omt 
| || ||I/L|| || ||Omotik|| || || || ||
|-
!omu 
| || ||I/E|| || ||Omurano|| ||omurano|| || ||
|-
!omw 
| || ||I/L|| || ||Tairora, South|| || || || ||
|-
!omx 
| || ||I/H|| || ||Mon, Old|| || ||古孟语|| ||
|-
!ona 
| || ||I/L|| || ||Ona|| || || || ||
|-
!onb 
| || ||I/L|| || ||Lingao|| || ||临高语|| ||
|-
!one 
| || ||I/L|| ||Onʌyota’a:ka||Oneida||oneida||oneida||奥内达语|| ||
|-
!ong 
| || ||I/L|| || ||Olo|| || || || ||
|-
!oni 
| || ||I/L|| || ||Onin|| || || || ||
|-
!onj 
| || ||I/L|| || ||Onjob|| || || || ||
|-
!onk 
| || ||I/L|| || ||One, Kabore|| || || || ||
|-
!onn 
| || ||I/L|| || ||Onobasulu|| || || || ||
|-
!ono 
| || ||I/L|| ||Onǫta’kéka’||Onondaga||onondaga||onondaga|| || ||
|-
!onp 
| || ||I/L|| || ||Sartang|| || || || ||
|-
!onr 
| || ||I/L|| || ||One, Northern|| || || || ||
|-
!ons 
| || ||I/L|| || ||Ono|| || || || ||
|-
!ont 
| || ||I/L|| || ||Ontenu|| || || || ||
|-
!onu 
| || ||I/L|| || ||Unua|| || || || ||
|-
!onw 
| || ||I/H|| || ||Nubian, Old|| || ||古努比亚语|| ||
|-
!onx 
| || ||I/L|| || ||Onin Based Pidgin|| || || || ||
|-
!ood 
| || ||I/L|| ||O'odham||Tohono O'odham||papago||pápago|| ||тогоно о'одам||Tohono O'odham
|-
!oog 
| || ||I/L|| || ||Ong|| || || || ||
|-
!oon 
| || ||I/L|| || ||Önge|| || || || ||
|-
!oor 
| || ||I/L|| || ||Oorlams|| || || || ||
|-
!oos 
| || ||I/A|| || ||Ossetic, Old|| || ||古奥塞梯语|| ||
|-
!opa 
| || ||I/L|| || ||Okpamheri|| || || || ||
|-
!(ope) 
| || || || || ||Old Persian|| || || || ||
|-
!opk 
| || ||I/L|| || ||Kopkaka|| || || || ||
|-
!opm 
| || ||I/L|| || ||Oksapmin|| || || || ||
|-
!opo 
| || ||I/L|| || ||Opao|| || || || ||
|-
!opt 
| || ||I/E|| || ||Opata|| ||ópata|| || ||
|-
!opy 
| || ||I/L|| || ||Ofayé|| || || || ||
|-
!ora 
| || ||I/L|| || ||Oroha|| || || || ||
|-
!orc 
| || ||I/L|| || ||Orma|| || || || ||
|-
!ore 
| || ||I/L|| || ||Orejón|| ||orejón|| || ||
|-
!org 
| || ||I/L|| || ||Oring|| || || || ||
|-
!orh 
| || ||I/L|| || ||Oroqen|| || ||鄂伦春语|| ||
|-
!ori 
|or||ori||M/L||Indo-European||ଓଡ଼ିଆ||Oriya||oriya||oriya||奥利亚语; 奥里亚语||ория||Oriya
|-
!(ork) 
| || || || || ||Orokaiva|| || || || ||
|-
!orm 
|om||orm||M/L||Afro-Asiatic||Oromoo||Oromo||galla||oromo||奥罗莫语||оромо||Oromo
|-
!orn 
| || ||I/L|| || ||Orang Kanaq|| || || || ||
|-
!oro 
| || ||I/L|| || ||Orokolo|| || || || ||
|-
!orr 
| || ||I/L|| || ||Oruma|| || || || ||
|-
!ors 
| || ||I/L|| || ||Orang Seletar|| || || || ||
|-
!ort 
| || ||I/L|| || ||Oriya, Adivasi|| || || || ||
|-
!oru 
| || ||I/L|| || ||Ormuri|| || || || ||
|-
!orv 
| || ||I/H|| || ||Russian, Old|| || ||古俄语|| ||
|-
!orw 
| || ||I/L|| || ||Oro Win|| ||oro win|| || ||
|-
!orx 
| || ||I/L|| || ||Oro|| || || || ||
|-
!ory 
| || ||I/L|| || ||Oriya (individual language)|| || || || ||
|-
!orz 
| || ||I/L|| || ||Ormu|| || || || ||
|-
!osa 
| ||osa||I/L|| ||𐓏𐓘𐓻𐓘𐓻𐓟||Osage||osage||osage||奥萨格语||оседжи||
|-
!osc 
| || ||I/A|| || ||Oscan||osque||osco||奥斯坎语||оскский||Oskisch
|-
!osi 
| || ||I/L|| || ||Osing|| || || || ||
|-
!oso 
| || ||I/L|| || ||Ososo|| || || || ||
|-
!osp 
| || ||I/H|| || ||Spanish, Old|| || ||古西班牙语|| ||
|-
!oss 
|os||oss||I/L||Indo-European||иронау||Ossetian||ossète||oseto||奥塞梯语; 奥塞提语||осетинский||Ossetisch
|-
!ost 
| || ||I/L|| || ||Osatu|| || || || ||
|-
!osu 
| || ||I/L|| || ||One, Southern|| || || || ||
|-
!osx 
| || ||I/H|| || ||Saxon, Old|| || ||古撒克逊语|| ||
|-
!ota 
| ||ota||I/H|| ||لسان عثمانى||Turkish, Ottoman (1500–1928)||Turc ottoman||Turco-otomano||奥斯曼土耳其语||старотурецкий||Osmanisch
|-
!otb 
| || ||I/H|| || ||Tibetan, Old|| || ||古藏语|| ||
|-
!otd 
| || ||I/L|| || ||Dohoi|| || || || ||
|-
!ote 
| || ||I/L|| || ||Otomi, Mezquital|| || || || ||
|-
!oti 
| || ||I/E|| || ||Oti|| || || || ||
|-
!otk 
| || ||I/H|| || ||Turkish, Old|| || ||古突厥语|| ||
|-
!otl 
| || ||I/L|| || ||Otomi, Tilapa|| || || || ||
|-
!otm 
| || ||I/L|| || ||Otomi, Eastern Highland|| || || || ||
|-
!otn 
| || ||I/L|| || ||Otomi, Tenango|| || || || ||
|-
!otq 
| || ||I/L|| || ||Otomi, Querétaro|| || || || ||
|-
!otr 
| || ||I/L|| || ||Otoro|| || || || ||
|-
!ots 
| || ||I/L|| || ||Otomi, Estado de México|| || || || ||
|-
!ott 
| || ||I/L|| || ||Otomi, Temoaya|| || || || ||
|-
!otu 
| || ||I/E|| || ||Otuke|| || || || ||
|-
!otw 
| || ||I/L|| || Nishnaabemwin (Daawaamwin) ||Ottawa||ottawa|| || || ||
|-
!otx 
| || ||I/L|| || ||Otomi, Texcatepec|| || || || ||
|-
!oty 
| || ||I/A|| || ||Tamil, Old|| || ||古泰米尔语|| ||
|-
!otz 
| || ||I/L|| || ||Otomi, Ixtenco|| || || || ||
|-
!oua 
| || ||I/L|| || ||Tagargrent|| || || || ||
|-
!oub 
| || ||I/L|| || ||Glio-Oubi|| || || || ||
|-
!oue 
| || ||I/L|| || ||Oune|| || || || ||
|-
!oui 
| || ||I/H|| || ||Uighur, Old|| || ||回鹘语|| ||
|-
!oum 
| || ||I/E|| || ||Ouma|| || || || ||
|-
!(oun) 
| || ||I/L|| || ||!O!ung|| || || || ||
|-
!ovd 
| || ||I/L||Indo-European|| ||Elfdalian, Övdalian|| || || || ||
|-
!owi 
| || ||I/L|| || ||Owiniga|| || || || ||
|-
!owl 
| || ||I/H|| || ||Welsh, Old|| || ||古威尔士语|| ||
|-
!oyb 
| || ||I/L|| || ||Oy|| || || || ||
|-
!oyd 
| || ||I/L|| || ||Oyda|| || || || ||
|-
!oym 
| || ||I/L|| || ||Wayampi|| ||wayampi|| || ||
|-
!oyy 
| || ||I/L|| || ||Oya'oya|| || || || ||
|-
!ozm 
| || ||I/L|| || ||Koonzime|| || || || ||
|}

ISO 639